Fojana is a village west of Dobrovo in the Municipality of Brda in the Littoral region of Slovenia, next to the border with Italy.

Church
The parish church in the village is dedicated to Saint Florian and belongs to the Diocese of Koper. A second church, built just outside the village, is dedicated to the Holy Spirit and belongs to the same parish.

Notable people
Notable people that were born or lived in Fojana include:
 Rado Simoniti (1914–1981), composer and conductor

References

External links

Fojana on Geopedia

Populated places in the Municipality of Brda